Andrew Hewitt (born 28 March 1976) is an English composer based in Los Angeles.

Training
Hewitt was classically trained from childhood as a pianist and tenor singer. He won music scholarships to Westminster Abbey Choir, Uppingham School, the National Youth Music Theatre, St John's College, Cambridge, and the Guildhall School of Music and Drama. Before university, he toured chorally worldwide, and after graduation in 2000 continued to perform in concerts, global tours, and CD recordings for such classical groups as John Eliot Gardiner's Monteverdi Choir, Robert King's The King's Consort, The John Rutter Singers, Synergy, Opera Rara, the London Voices, and Metro Voices. These performances covered every style, from contemporary premieres to session choirs and baroque, classical, and avant-garde works.

At Abbey Road and Air Studios, he performed on many film scores for such conductors as John Williams and Howard Shore – including The Lord of the Rings film trilogy, Harry Potter, Star Wars, and Pirates of the Caribbean.

Film scoring
Hewitt is Associate Member of PRS for Music, and recently accepted invitations to become a member of both the World Soundtrack Academy and BAFTA. Combining a lifelong passion for film with extensive classical training, recording, and worldwide concert experience, he orchestrates and conducts all his scores which he fuses with electronic textures at his studio.

Awards and nominations
 BAFTA Nomination as Best New Composer for Film and TV

Motion pictures
 We Have Always Lived in the Castle – dir Stacie Passon
Old Boys – dir Toby Macdonald, prod Luke Morris
 A Crooked Somebody – dir Trevor White, starring Ed Harris, Rich Sommer
 The Divide – dir Katharine Round, featuring Kwame Anthony Appiah, Noam Chomsky, Kate Pickett, Richard Wilkinson
 Mojave – dir Bill Monahan, starring Garrett Hedlund, Oscar Isaac, Mark Wahlberg
 The Stanford Prison Experiment – dir Kyle Alvarez, starring Michael Angarano, Ezra Miller
 Bill – dir Richard Bracewell, starring Ben Willbond, Laurence Rickard
 The Double – dir Richard Ayoade, starring Jesse Eisenberg & Mia Wasikowska
 The Sea – dir Stephen Brown, starring Ciarán Hinds, violin soloist Hilary Hahn
 The Brass Teapot – dir Ramaa Mosley, starring Juno Temple & Michael Angarano
 Four Horsemen – dir Ross Ashcroft, Motherlode, with Noam Chomsky
 Submarine – dir Richard Ayoade, Warp Films, starring Sally Hawkins, prod Ben Stiller
 Cuckoo – dir Richard Bracewell, Punk Cinema, starring Richard E. Grant

Television series
Hindenburg: Titanic of the Skies – dir Sean Grundy, TV movie, Pioneer
Garth Marenghi's Darkplace – dir Richard Ayoade, Avalon
Man to Man with Dean Learner – dir Richard Ayoade, Avalon
Catastrophe – Discovery US, Pioneer, C4
Extreme Hotels – Pioneer, Travel
 National Geographic – three documentaries
The Stuarts – BBC
Whatever Happened to Harry Hill?
Globe Trekker
Parking Tribunal – BBC
Parasomnias – BBC
Krystal Klairvoyant

External links 
 
 

English film score composers
English male film score composers
British film score composers
Alumni of St John's College, Cambridge
Alumni of the Guildhall School of Music and Drama
1976 births
Living people